The women's tournament in goalball at the 2012 Summer Paralympics was contested from 30 August to 7 September. 28 matches were played; 20 in the group play, 4 quarter-finals, 2 semi-finals, a bronze medal match, and a gold medal match.

Ten teams participated, with six athletes per team. Japan won the gold medal by beating China in the final, while Sweden beat Finland in the match for bronze.

Competition format
The teams were divided into two equal groups for a single round robin group stage. The top four teams of each group advanced to the quarter-finals. All matches in the second stage were knock-out format.

Participating teams

Group C
 (roster)
 (roster)
 (roster)
 (roster)
 (roster)

Group D
 (roster)
 (roster)
 (roster)
 (roster)
 (roster)

Venue
All matches were played in the Copper Box.

Preliminary round
All times are local (BST/UTC+1)

Group C

Group D

Knock-out round

Quarter-finals

Semi-finals

Bronze medal match

Gold medal match

Final rankings

Source:

Statistics

Leading goalscorers

Source:

See also
Goalball at the 2012 Summer Paralympics – Men's tournament

References

External links

Women's tournament
2012 in women's sport